The Squatter and the Clown is a 1911 Australian silent film.

Plot
According to a contemporary report "this is said to be a typical story, of the bush, telling the touching story, of a strolling player's devotion to his wife. The play is produced in 15 scenes."

Release
In New Zealand the film was described as a "New Zealand bush drama".

The Adelaide Advertiser called it a "dramatic film of high merit."

References

External links
The Squatter and the Clown at IMDb
Squatter and the Clown at Ausstage

Australian black-and-white films
Australian silent films
1911 films
1910s Australian films